Iraada is a 1991 Bollywood film starring Shatrughan Sinha, Parveen Babi, Moon Moon Sen in lead roles and music by Kalyanji-Anandji. This was also Parveen Babi's last film before she retired from the film industry.

Cast 

Shatrughan Sinha as Ashok Sinha
Parveen Babi as Kiran
Moon Moon Sen as Geeta Sen, Journalist
Suresh Oberoi as Vinod
Om Puri as Shankar
Ranjeet as Tako Dada
Amrish Puri as Dinanath
Jeevan as Mr. Gupta
Nazir Hussain as Mr. Sharma
Iftekhar as Mr. Ali
Sudhir Dalvi as Mr. Gomes
Paidi Jairaj as Sevak Ram
Bharat Bhushan
Jankidas as Janki
Girija Shankar as Mr. Khanna
Brahmachari as Ramu
Prema Narayan as Dancer

Soundtrack
All songs are music by Kalyanji-Anandji. This is one of the last released Hindi films where Kishore Kumar has lent his voice.

External links
 

1991 films
Films scored by Kalyanji Anandji
1990s Hindi-language films